N. nepalensis may refer to:

 Neocollyris nepalensis, a ground beetle
 Nepeta nepalensis, a flowering plant
 Nesticella nepalensis, a scaffold web spider
 Nicrophorus nepalensis, a burying beetle
 Nomada nepalensis, a cuckoo bee
 Notiophilus nepalensis, a ground beetle